The 2019 Varsity Shield was the 9th season of the Varsity Shield, the second-tier competition in the annual Varsity Rugby series. It was played between 18 February and 11 April 2019 and featured seven university teams.

Competition rules and information

There were seven participating university teams in the 2019 Varsity Shield. They played each other once during the pool stage, either at home or away. Teams received four points for a win and two points for a draw. Bonus points were awarded to teams that scored four or more tries in a game, as well as to teams that lost a match by seven points or less. Teams were ranked by log points, then points difference (points scored less points conceded).

The top four teams after the pool stage qualified for the semifinals, which were followed by a final. 2019 is a non-relegation year.

Teams

The teams that played in the 2019 Varsity Cup are:

Pool stage

Standings

The final log for the 2019 Varsity Shield was:

Matches

The following matches were played in the 2019 Varsity Shield:

Round one

Round two

Round three

Round four

Round five

Round six

Round seven

Play-offs

Semifinals

Final

References

2019
2019 in South African rugby union
2019 rugby union tournaments for clubs